George Howard Branson (23 February 1918 – 27 January 1999) was an Australian politician who served as a Senator for Western Australia from 1958 to 1971, representing the Liberal Party.

Branson was born in Perth to Howard Henry Branson and the former Ethel May Carrett. He grew up on a farm in the small rural locality of Babakin. After leaving school, Branson worked as a salesman until 1940, when he joined the Australian Army and trained as a machine gunner. He was captured in the Fall of Singapore in 1942. and spent three years as a prisoner of war. Branson returned to Babakin after the war's end, purchasing a farming property.

In early 1955, Branson was preselected for the Liberal Party's Senate ticket at the 1955 federal election. The serving senator he replaced on the ticket was Agnes Robertson, a 73-year-old widow. She switched to the Country Party, and narrowly defeated him for the final Senate seat. However, Branson reprised his candidacy at the 1958 election and was elected, filling a casual vacancy occasioned by the death of Harrie Seward. He held the seat until his retirement in 1970. Branson was an "active backbencher"; his penchant for controversy and apparent unwillingness to toe the party line likely denied him career advancement. He initially stayed in Canberra after leaving the Senate, but later returned to Perth and died there in 1999.

References

Liberal Party of Australia members of the Parliament of Australia
Members of the Australian Senate for Western Australia
Members of the Australian Senate
1918 births
1999 deaths
20th-century Australian politicians
Politicians from Perth, Western Australia
Australian farmers
Australian prisoners of war
World War II prisoners of war held by Japan
Australian Army personnel of World War II
Australian Army soldiers